NAKS or Naks may refer to:
 NAKS (Na Afrikan Kulturu fu Sranan), a social and cultural organization
 North American Kant Society
 NikNaks (South African snack), a brand of corn extruded snack produced by the Simba Chip company in South Africa
 Nik Naks (British snack), a brand of corn extruded snack produced by KP Snacks in the United Kingdom

See also
 Nak (disambiguation)